Jasper Joseph Inman Kane (March 19, 1894, San Diego – August 25, 1975, Santa Monica, California) was an American film director, film producer, film editor and screenwriter. He is best known for his extensive directorship and focus on Western films.

Biography
Kane began his career as a professional cellist. In 1934 he took an interest in film directing and, starting in 1935, he co-directed serials for Mascot Pictures and Republic Pictures. He soon became Republic's top Western film director.

Kane's first directorial credit was for The Fighting Marines (1935). When Mascot Pictures and several other small film companies amalgamated into Republic Pictures in 1935, Kane became staff director, remaining at the studio until it ceased production in 1958. He piloted many Gene Autry and Roy Rogers movies and directed John Wayne in films such as The Lawless Nineties (1936) and Flame of Barbary Coast (1944), and Joseph Schildkraut on The Cheaters (1945). Between 1935 and his death in 1975 he directed 119 films and numerous television series episodes.

Unlike most Republic house directors, Kane was also credited as associate producer on many of his films. During 1939-57 he was a major film producer, producing over 60 films. Kane was also a film editor and screenwriter responsible for the editing process of over 20 of his films, and he had a brief stint as an actor.

During the 1950s Kane worked steadily in television, with emphasis on Westerns and action series. He spent the last decade of his life as a second-unit director on such productions as Universal Studios Beau Geste (1966) and In Enemy Country (1968).

Kane died on August 25, 1975, in Santa Monica, California.

Partial filmography

 The Blind Trail (1926)
 The Cherokee Kid (1927)
 The Bronc Stomper (1928)
 Yellow Contraband (1928)
 The Boss of Rustler's Roost (1928)
 The Black Ace (1928)
 The Pride of Pawnee (1929)
 .45 Calibre War (1929)
 Big Money (1930)
The Big Gamble (1931) with William Boyd
In Old Santa Fe (1934) with Ken Maynard, George "Gabby" Hayes, and Gene Autry
Tumbling Tumblingweeds (1935) with Gene Autry and Smiley Burnette
The Headline Woman (1935)
Melody Trail (1935) with Gene Autry, Ann Rutherford, and Smiley Burnette
The Lawless Nineties (1936) with John Wayne, Ann Rutherford and George "Gabby" Hayes
Darkest Africa with Clyde Beatty
King of the Pecos (1936) with John Wayne and Muriel Evans
The Lonely Trail (1936) with John Wayne and Ann Rutherford
Guns and Guitars (1936) with Gene Autry and Smiley Burnette
Oh, Susanna! (1936) with Gene Autry and Smiley Burnette
Ride Ranger Ride (1936) with Gene Autry and Smiley Burnette
The Old Corral (1936) with Gene Autry and Smiley Burnette
Undersea Kingdom (1936) 
Git Along, Little Dogies (1937) with Gene Autry and Smiley Burnette
Round-Up Time in Texas (1937) with Gene Autry and Smiley Burnette
Yodelin' Kid from Pine Ridge (1937) with Gene Autry and Smiley Burnette
Public Cowboy No. 1 (1937) with Gene Autry, Smiley Burnette, and Ann Rutherford
Boots and Saddles (1937) with Gene Autry and Smiley Burnette
Springtime in the Rockies (1937) with Gene Autry and Smiley Burnette
Heart of the Rockies (1937)
The Old Barn Dance (1938) with Gene Autry, Smiley Burnette, and Roy Rogers
Under Western Stars (1938) with Roy Rogers (in his first lead role) and Smiley Burnette
Gold Mine in the Sky (1938) with Gene Autry and Smiley Burnette
Man from Music Mountain (1938) with Gene Autry and Smiley Burnette
Come On, Rangers (1938) with Roy Rogers
Shine On, Harvest Moon (1938) with Roy Rogers
Days of Jesse James (1939) with Roy Rogers and George "Gabby" Hayes
Colorado (1940) with Roy Rogers
Sheriff of Tombstone (1941) with Roy Rogers and George "Gabby" Hayes
Robin Hood of the Pecos (1941) with Roy Rogers and George "Gabby" Hayes
Man from Cheyenne (1942) with Roy Rogers and George "Gabby" Hayes
Sons of the Pioneers (1942) with Roy Rogers
Romance on the Range (1942) with Roy Rogers and George "Gabby" Hayes
The Man from Music Mountain (1943) with Roy Rogers
King of the Cowboys (1943) with Roy Rogers and Smiley Burnette
The Cowboy and the Senorita (1944) with Roy Rogers
The Yellow Rose of Texas (1944) with Roy Rogers
Flame of Barbary Coast (1945) with John Wayne and William Frawley
Wyoming (1947) 
 The Last Bandit (1949)
 Brimstone (1949)
 California Passage (1950)Ride the Man Down (1952) with Brian Donlevy and Ella RainesHoodlum Empire (1952) with Brian Donlevy and Claire TrevorFair Wind to Java (1953) with Fred MacMurray, Vera Ralston, and Robert DouglasJubilee Trail (1954) with Vera RalstonTimberjack (1955) with Sterling Hayden and Hoagy CarmichaelThe Road to Denver (1955) with John Payne, Mona Freeman, Lee J. Cobb, Ray Middleton, and Skip HomeierAccused of Murder (1956) with David Brian, Vera Ralston, and Sidney BlackmerThe Maverick Queen (1956) with Barbara StanwyckThe Crooked Circle (1957) with John Smith and Fay SpainTrack of Thunder (1967) with Faith DomergueSmoke in the Wind'' (1975) with Walter Brennan

Notable actors directed by Kane

Robert Armstrong
Gene Autry
Clyde Beatty
Scott Brady
Walter Brennan
Edgar Buchanan
Smiley Burnette
Rod Cameron
Lee Van Cleef

Elisha Cook, Jr.
Jim Davis
Paul Fix
Sterling Hayden
George "Gabby" Hayes
Jack Ingram
Chubby Johnson
Fred MacMurray

Gerald Mohr
Peggy Moran
Jack O'Shea
Roy Rogers
Ann Rutherford
Barbara Stanwyck
John Wayne
Hank Worden

References

External links

 

Film producers from California
American film editors
American male screenwriters
Western (genre) film directors
American classical cellists
Writers from San Diego
1894 births
1975 deaths
Film directors from California
20th-century American musicians
20th-century classical musicians
Screenwriters from California
20th-century American male writers
20th-century American screenwriters
20th-century cellists